Cly is a castle in the Italian town of Saint-Denis, overlooking the Dora Baltea river, in Aosta Valley, northwest Italy. It belongs to the so-called primitive style of castle, consisting of a keep with a surrounding wall. The ruins rise from a bed of metamorphic rock, on the edge of a fault line which extends to the Castle of Quart.

History
Cly was first mentioned in a document from 1207, in which the "chapel sancti Mauricij (Saint Maurice) de castro Cliuo" is mentioned among the goods of the Vicarage of Saint-Gilles in Verrès, but the keep has been dated to 1027 using an analysis of the tree rings in its timbers (dendrochronology). Originally a fief held from the Counts of Savoy, in 1376 the direct ownership passed to the Duchy of Savoy, which installed a castellan to administer it for them until abandoned in 1550. The castle fell to ruins in the centuries that followed.

The castle today 
Eventually the castle ruins became the property of the nearby town of Saint-Denis. The castle is visible atop the hill overlooking the town of Chambave. The castle is open to guided tours only in July and August. In addition to Cly, there are about 150 medieval castles, towers and fortified houses in the Aosta Valley.

References

External links 
 "Cly Castle" Aosta Valley Tourism Board (Office du Tourisme de la Vallée d'Aoste, accessed March 12, 2015 at http://www.lovevda.it/en/database/8/castles-and-towers/saint-denis/cly-castle/1220
 "Castle of cly" Culture: Castles and Towers. Office for Tourism, Sports, Trade and Transport Official Website, 2015. Accessed March 15, 2015. http://www.lovevda.it/es/base-de-datos/8/castillos-y-torres/saint-denis/castillo-de-cly/1220
 "The Valle d'Aosta and Its Castles" Discovery Italy, accessed March 12, 2015 at http://www.italia.it/en/travel-ideas/art-and-history/valle-daosta-and-its-castles.html

Castles in Aosta Valley